Tempo Maguires is a Gaelic Athletic Association club based in the village of Tempo, County Fermanagh, Northern Ireland.

History
The club was affiliated in 1929 and won its first championship by claiming the Fermanagh Junior title in 1949. Tempo won their first Fermanagh Senior Football Championship title in 1970 and followed this up with wins in 1972 and 1973.

The Maguires won their fourth Senior championship in 2012, defeating Lisnaskea Emmetts in the final.

The club's ladies' team won the Fermanagh Intermediate title for the first time in 2020.

Honours

Mens' football
 Fermanagh Senior Football Championship (4): 1970, 1972, 1973, 2012
 Fermanagh Senior Football League (5): 1961, 1970, 1972, 1974, 2012
 Fermanagh Intermediate Football Championship (3): 1991, 1996, 2002
 Fermanagh Junior Football Championship (2): 1949, 1957

Ladies' football
 Fermanagh Ladies Intermediate Football Championship (1): 2020
 Fermanagh Ladies Junior Football Championship (2): 2007, 2010

References

External links
 Official Website

Gaelic football clubs in County Fermanagh
Gaelic games clubs in County Fermanagh